Sa-rang is a Korean feminine given name. Unlike most Korean names, which are composed of two Sino-Korean roots each written with one hanja, "Sarang" is an indigenous Korean name: a single word meaning "love". It is one of a number of such indigenous names which became more popular in South Korea in the late 20th century.

People
People with this name include:
 Kim Sa-rang (actress) (born 1978), South Korean actress
 Kim Sa-rang (singer) (born 1981), South Korean rock singer-songwriter
 Kim Sa-rang (badminton) (born 1989), South Korean badminton player
 Park Sa-rang (born 2003), South Korean actress

Fictional characters
 Kim Sa-rang, in the 2014 South Korean television drama I'm Dying Soon
 Cha Sa-rang, in the 2015 South Korean television series Super Daddy Yeol
 Oh Sa-rang, in the 2017 South Korean television series School 2017
 Maeng Sa-rang, in the 2018 South Korean television series Sweet Revenge 2

See also
List of Korean given names

References

Given names
Korean feminine given names